Edward John "Ed" Speleers (born 7 April 1988) is an English actor and producer. He is best known for playing the title role in the 2006 film Eragon, the antagonist character Stephen Bonnet in the TV series Outlander, as well as James "Jimmy" Kent in the TV series Downton Abbey. He currently appears as Jack Crusher in the third season of Star Trek: Picard (2023) and Rhys Montrose in the fourth season of You (2023).

Speleers has been nominated for both the Saturn Awards, as Best Young Actor, and the British Academy Film Awards, for a short film he co-produced.

Early life 
Speleers was born at St Richard's Hospital, Chichester, West Sussex, England. He is of Belgian descent. His parents divorced when he was three, with his mother residing in Spain and his father in London. He has two older half brothers. While still in school, Speleers performed in school productions such as A Midsummer Night's Dream and Richard III. In addition to acting, Speleers wrote a play that was performed at Eastbourne College, in Sussex, where he attended. Extraordinarily controversial, Retribution dealt with the subject of paedophilia and was met with stunned reactions. Speleers completed his education in 2006.

Career

2006–2010
Speleers' first professional role in 2006 was the lead in 20th Century Fox's screen version of Christopher Paolini's hit book Eragon. Before landing the role of Eragon, he auditioned for various roles, including Peter Pevensie in The Chronicles of Narnia: The Lion, the Witch and the Wardrobe, which he lost to William Moseley. His next role, in 2008, was Jimmy Penwarden on the British prime time series Echo Beach. He also appeared in the comedy Moving Wallpaper and an episode of Moving Wallpaper: The Mole, which many saw as a parody of Echo Beach.

2009 saw Speleers tackle the role of Robin Cecil Byng in the Japanese television miniseries Jiro Shirasu: Man of Honor, which highlighted the intermediary between American and Japanese negotiators at the conclusion of World War II. The next year, Speleers played the role of Jason Grint in the made-for-television fantasy-adventure film Witchville and starred in director Aimee Powell's short film Deathless. Continuing with short films in 2011, Speleers appeared in director Marion Pilowski's short The Ride and Julian Gilbey's short A Lonely Place to Die.

2012–2015
In 2012, Speleers starred as Jamie in Andy de Emmony's comedy horror film Love Bite, alongside Jessica Szohr and Timothy Spall. He was cast in the film A Dead Man in Deptford, based upon Anthony Burgess' novel of the same name, but the film was never completed. That same year Speleers was cast in the recurring role of Jimmy Kent in the award-winning ITV series Downton Abbey.

The short film Turncoat (2013), from Dark Matter productions, featured Speleers as Nathan Reese. He then starred as Sam in 2014's thriller Plastic, which was written and directed by Julian Gilbey for Gateway Films. Production was shot in Britain, Miami and Brunei from January 2013. On 12 March 2014 it was reported that Speleers was among five actors being considered for a lead role in Star Wars: The Force Awakens, but was cut during the casting process.

In 2015, Speleers had a small role in the BBC's historical drama mini-series Wolf Hall as Edward Seymour, brother of Henry VIII's third wife Jane Seymour. He also played a leading role in the direct-to-DVD werewolf horror film Howl, as a young train conductor overseeing the final London train. That same year, Speleers guest starred in the BBC One six-part mini-series Partners in Crime, an adaptation of two of Agatha Christie's novels, which focused on crime-solving couple Tommy and Tuppence Beresford. Speleers appeared in three episodes based on the story N or M?, in the role of Carl Denim. He went on to portray Greg in director Omer Fast's psychological thriller Remainder.

2016–present
In 2016, he played the role of Slean in ITV's epic fantasy drama television series from, Beowulf: Return to the Shieldlands. He had a supporting role in Disney's fantasy adventure sequel Alice Through the Looking Glass from director James Bobin. The following year he starred in the biopic Breathe, opposite Andrew Garfield and Claire Foy. The film, actor Andy Serkis' directoral debut, follows the experiences of paraplegic Robin Cavendish, who is recognized as having helped pioneer the development of wheelchairs equipped with mechanical lungs.

In 2017, Speleers was a producer on Barnaby Blackburn's short film Wale. The film, which centers on racial prejudices in Britain today, was nominated for a British Academy Film Awards in 2018 in the Short Film category. In late 2017, Speleers was confirmed to appear in season four and five of Starz's time-travel drama series Outlander as Irish smuggler and pirate Stephen Bonnet.

In 2018, Speleers starred in the dark comedy-horror film Zoo, which centers on a couple in crisis and attempting to reconcile during a zombie pandemic. He went on to feature in Lars Von Trier's psychological thriller The House That Jack Built, which premiered at the Cannes Film Festival. On 20 August 2018, Speleers made his stage premiere in the play Rain Man, portraying the lead role of Charlie Babbitt. The play, based upon the film of the same, name, was directed by Jonathan O'Boyle and has toured various theatres throughout the United Kingdom.

Romantic comedy For Love or Money featured Speleers as Johnny, opposite Robert Kazinsky and Samantha Barks, in 2019. He is co-starring in the upcoming romantic comedy Irish Wish alongside Lindsay Lohan.

Personal life
Speleers lives in Bristol, England. He is married to Asia Macey; the couple have two children.

Filmography

Film

Shorts

Television

Theatre

Video Games

Awards and nominations

References

External links
 
 

1988 births
English male child actors
English male film actors
English male models
Living people
People educated at Eastbourne College
People from Chichester
21st-century English male actors
English people of Belgian descent